Romário de Souza Faria Filho (born 20 September 1993), commonly known as Romarinho, is a Brazilian footballer who plays as a forward.

He made two substitute appearances for Vasco da Gama in the 2015 Campeonato Brasileiro Série A, but spent most of his career in the lower leagues of Brazilian football.

Club career
Born in Barcelona, Spain, Romarinho joined Vasco da Gama's youth setup in 2007. On 5 December 2012, he rescinded with the club, and moved to Brasiliense a day later.

Romarinho made his senior debuts during the 2013 campaign, scoring a goal in the year's Campeonato Brasiliense 3–0 win over Brasília. On 5 January 2015 he left Brasiliense, and immediately returned to his first club Vasco.

Romarinho made his Série A debut on 29 August 2015, coming on as a late substitute for Julio dos Santos in a 0–1 home loss against Figueirense.

At the end of 2015, Romarinho agreed to spend the upcoming year with Zweigen Kanazawa in the J. League Division 2, and he returned to a contract at Macaé for the 2017 Campeonato Carioca. At its conclusion, he joined Tupi for the year's Série C campaign, He scored just once in his spell in Minas Gerais, a consolation in a 3–2 home loss to Bragantino on 9 September.

In December 2017, Romarinho signed for Figueirense. He played only three matches as they won the Campeonato Catarinense, scoring on 24 January to win the home game against Brusque. Despite his low involvement – partially due to competition from Henan – his contract was extended to the end of the year, taking in the Alvinegro team's Série B campaign.

Romarinho returned to Tupi in January 2019. Three months later, after finishing the 2019 Campeonato Mineiro with eight games and one goal, he signed for Maringá for the 2019 Campeonato Brasileiro Série D.

On 9 December 2019, Romarinho returned to Santa Catarina, joining Joinville for the upcoming state league season.

For 2021, Romarinho transferred to Campeonato Gaúcho side Novo Hamburgo. He played five league games before leaving for personal reasons on 26 March.

In January 2022, Romarinho signed with Icasa of the Campeonato Cearense for the year. Having played just 25 minutes, he left by mutual consent in March before the Série D season began.

Personal life
Romarinho's father, Romário, was also a footballer and a forward. He too was groomed at Vasco.

Honours
Brasiliense
Campeonato Brasiliense: 2013

Figueirense
Campeonato Catarinense: 2018

References

External links

1993 births
Living people
Footballers from Barcelona
Brazilian footballers
Brazilian expatriate footballers
Association football forwards
Campeonato Brasileiro Série A players
Campeonato Brasileiro Série C players
Campeonato Brasileiro Série D players
Brasiliense Futebol Clube players
CR Vasco da Gama players
J2 League players
Zweigen Kanazawa players
Expatriate footballers in Japan
Macaé Esporte Futebol Clube players
Tupi Football Club players
Figueirense FC players
Brazilian expatriate sportspeople in Japan
Maringá Futebol Clube players
Joinville Esporte Clube players
Esporte Clube Novo Hamburgo players